New Port Richey East is an unincorporated census-designated place in Pasco County, Florida, United States adjacent to New Port Richey. The population was 9,916 at the 2000 census.

Geography
New Port Richey East is located at  (28.259991, -82.690636).

Demographics

As of the census of 2000, there were 9,916 people, 4,471 households, and 2,794 families residing in the community. The racial makeup of the community was 95.40% White, 1.04% African American, 0.22% Native American, 1.11% Asian, 0.03% Pacific Islander, 0.67% from other races, and 1.53% from two or more races. Hispanic or Latino of any race were 4.88% of the population.

There were 4,471 households, out of which 22.9% had children under the age of 18 living with them, 48.0% were married couples living together, 10.5% had a female householder with no husband present, and 37.5% were non-families. 31.4% of all households were made up of individuals, and 16.7% had someone living alone who was 65 years of age or older.  The average household size was 2.20 and the average family size was 2.73.

In the community the population was spread out, with 19.8% under the age of 18, 6.9% from 18 to 24, 23.6% from 25 to 44, 22.7% from 45 to 64, and 27.1% who were 65 years of age or older.  The median age was 45 years. For every 100 females, there were 89.6 males.  For every 100 females age 18 and over, there were 87.1 males.

The median income for a household in the community was $30,178, and the median income for a family was $36,296. Males had a median income of $27,753 versus $23,191 for females. The per capita income for the community was $17,191.  About 8.0% of families and 10.8% of the population were below the poverty line, including 14.1% of those under age 18 and 8.3% of those age 65 or over.

References

External links
 New Port Richey Local Weather Conditions & Webcam

Census-designated places in Pasco County, Florida
Census-designated places in Florida